Lake Easy is a natural freshwater lake with a  surface area. The lake is somewhat oval in shape and sometimes has a small island in its southeast part, depending on the lake level at the time. Lake Easy is bounded on its north by the incorporated village of Highland Park, which is also a golf resort. On its west side is grassland and a residential development. To the southwest are a citrus orchard and pastureland. On the southeast is residential housing along Lake Easy Road. Along its east side is public land.

Lake Easy has no public swimming area. It does, however, have a public boat ramp on the east side. This ramp can be accessed by a sand road that appears by satellite image to come from Lake Easy Road or Underpass Road. A 2008 news story in The Ledger newspaper said the ramp is on Muncie Road, which does not appear on maps. This lake may be fished near the boat ramp or by boats on the lake. The Hook and Bullet website says the lake contains black drum, bigmouth buffalo and atlantic salmon.

References

Easy